The silverbird  (Empidornis semipartitus) is an Old World flycatcher native to Eastern Africa, from Sudan to Tanzania. The species is the only member of the genus Empidornis, although it is sometimes placed in the genus Melaenornis .

Description 

The silverbird is a stunning flycatcher of open areas west of the Rift Valley, silvery grey above and tawny orange below. Juveniles have black-bordered tawny spots on upperparts, mottled buff and black on throats and breasts.

The call of the silverbird uses short phrases which are slightly thrush-like. Sometimes the terminal note is higher and thinner, eee-sleeur-eeee or sweet siursur-eet-seet; also a longer eep-eep churEErip, eep-eep cherip chch chchch eee, embellished with chattering and seep notes.

References

Dale A. Zimmerman, Birds of Kenya and Northern Tanzania, Princeton University Press, 1999
 del Hoyo, J.; Elliot, A. & Christie D. (editors). (2006). Handbook of the Birds of the World. Volume 11: Old World Flycatchers to Old World Warblers. Lynx Edicions. .

External links
Image at ADW

Muscicapidae
Birds of East Africa
Birds described in 1840
Taxobox binomials not recognized by IUCN